Candy Éclair (foaled April 14, 1976 in Kentucky) was an American Thoroughbred racehorse.

Background
Bred and raced by prominent Pennsylvanian horsewoman Adele Paxson, she was a granddaughter of the most important sire of the 20th century, Northern Dancer. She was out of the mare Candy's Best, a daughter of the 1963 Santa Anita Derby and Preakness Stakes winner Candy Spots.

Racing career
Candy Éclair was conditioned for racing by Allen King and winter-trained at the Aiken Training Track in Aiken, South Carolina. Undefeated in all five of her starts at age two, she shared 1978 American Champion Two-Year-Old Filly honors with It's In The Air. Candy Éclair won stakes races again at age three and four, finishing her career having won fifteen of her twenty-three starts. She was elected to the Aiken Thoroughbred Racing Hall of Fame on March 17, 1979.

Breeding record
As a broodmare, Candy Éclair produced five foals, none of which met with racing success.

References
 Candy Eclair's pedigree and partial racing stats
 Candy Éclair at the Aiken Thoroughbred Racing Hall of Fame and Museum

1976 racehorse births
Racehorses bred in Kentucky
Racehorses trained in the United States
Eclipse Award winners
Thoroughbred family 1-a